Patriarch John III may refer to:

 Pope John II (III) of Alexandria (Patriarch John III of Alexandria), ruled in 505–516
 Patriarch John III of Jerusalem, patriarch of Antioch from 846 to 873
 Patriarch John III of Antioch (ruled in 797–810)
 John III, Maronite Patriarch (designation contended among various people)